Robert S. Poston is an American cardiac surgeon at University of Arizona Medical Center most noted for his work in robot-assisted heart surgery and Coronary Artery Bypass Surgery.

Career
Poston's first clinical appointment was in July 2002 under his mentor,  Bartley Griffith at the University of Maryland School of Medicine. With Griffith's guidance, he developed a clinical and research niche in off-pump Coronary artery bypass surgery and robotic CABG, establishing a national reputation in these areas.

Subsequently, he was recruited to become the chief of cardiac surgery at Boston University in March 2008. Poston came to Boston Medical Center as the chief of Cardiac Surgery with a plan to establish a program in robotic coronary bypass surgery 

In 2013 Robert Poston, joined the Department of Cardiovascular Surgery at St. Francis Medical Center in New Jersey.

In 2022, Robert Poston joined the surgical staff of Mercy Health Lourdes in Paducah, Kentucky.

Research 
Poston's research deals with the mechanism of early graft thrombosis was recognized with a five-year RO1 clinical research grant from the National Institutes of Health in 2007. He has also been awarded grants from Intuitive Surgical to study how robotics accelerates patient recovery time, Maquet to study the impact of endoscopic harvesting techniques on the quality of bypass conduits, and Cardiogenesis to study the impact of laser revascularization techniques on bypass graft flow. He has been the first/senior author of 100 papers and abstracts. His research manuscripts are available on PubMed.

References 

1967 births
American cardiac surgeons
University of Texas at Austin alumni
University of Arizona faculty
Stanford University fellows
Texas Longhorns baseball players
Johns Hopkins University alumni
People from Dallas
Living people